Serge Lebovici (10 June 1915, Paris – 11 August 2000, Marvejols) was a French psychiatrist and psychoanalyst.

References

1915 births
2000 deaths
Child psychiatrists
French psychiatrists
French psychoanalysts
20th-century French physicians